Alan Marnoch (6 April 1945 – 8 March 2021) was an Australian soccer player who played for Sydney Hakoah in the New South Wales State League and represented Australia 14 times between 1967 and 1969.

Early life
Marnoch was born in Scotland, emigrating to Australia as a teenager.

Playing career
After spending time with Lochgelly Albert, Thornton Hibs and being on the books of Dunfermline Athletic, Marnoch signed with Hakoah in Sydney.

Marnoch made his international debut for Australia against Scotland in 1967.

In 1969, Marnoch was one of a number of players whose eligibility was challenged by South Korea on the basis that he was playing for Australia as a British subject, rather than as an Australian citizen.

His international career came to an end after he was unable to get leave from his employment and his spot was taken by Peter Wilson.

Honours

Player
Hakoah
New South Wales State League Premiers: 1968, 1970, 1971, 1973, 1974

Individual
Football Federation Australia Men's Team of the Decade: 1963–1970

References

1945 births
2021 deaths
Australian soccer players
Scottish footballers
Hakoah Sydney City East FC players
Australia international soccer players
Association football defenders